This is a list of national parks in Namibia, operated by the Ministry of Environment and Tourism.

National parks 
ǀAi-ǀAis Hot Springs Game Park
Bwabwata National Park
Dorob National Park
Etosha National Park
Khaudum National Park
Mangetti National Park
Mudumu National Park
Namib-Naukluft National Park
Nkasa Rupara National Park
Skeleton Coast National Park
Tsau ǁKhaeb National Park
Waterberg Plateau Park

Other protected areas 

Cape Cross Seal Reserve
Daan Viljoen Game Reserve
Hardap Recreation Resort
Gross Barmen Hot Springs
Popa Game Park
South West Nature Park, the National Botanic Garden in Windhoek

Transfrontier conservation areas 
ǀAi-ǀAis/Richtersveld Transfrontier Park
Iona – Skeleton Coast Transfrontier Conservation Area
Kavango–Zambezi Transfrontier Conservation Area

See also  
List of national parks in Africa
Tourism in Namibia

External links
 Ministry of Environment, Forestry and Tourism
 Namibia Tourism Board

References

Namibia
National parks

National parks